The  is a single-car DC electric multiple unit (EMU) train type operated by West Japan Railway Company (JR-West) on local services in Japan since March 2003.

Design
The 125 series design is based on the 223-2000 series EMU design, with stainless bodies and steel front ends.

The cars have two pairs of sliding doors on each side, with provision for a third set of doors in the centre.

The second-batch cars (KuMoHa 125-9–12) delivered in 2003 differ from the earlier batch by having enlarged front-end skirts and darker grey tinted windows.

Operations
The 125 series is used on wanman driver-only operation services, primarily on the Obama Line and Kakogawa Line.

Up to five single cars can be operated together as a multiple car set.

Formation

Cars KuMoHa 125-7/8/11/12 are equipped with a second de-icing pantograph.

Interior
Passenger accommodation consists of longitudinal bench seating at the ends, and 2+2 abreast transverse reversible seating in the centre of the cars. The first two batches of cars (KuMoHa 125-1–12) were delivered with 1+2 abreast seating, but this was increased to 2+2 seating during 2003 and 2004.

History
These sets were initially allocated to Fukuchiyama Depot, but were subsequently transferred to Tsuruga Depot.

A further six cars (KuMoHa 125-13–18) were built in September 2006 to coincide with the conversion of Tsuruga area services from 20 kV AC to 1,500 DC electrification from 21 October 2006.

Further reading

References

Electric multiple units of Japan
West Japan Railway Company
Train-related introductions in 2003
Kawasaki multiple units
1500 V DC multiple units of Japan